Alliance C – Christians for Germany is a political party in Germany.

History
At the founding party conference in Fulda in March 2015, the Party for Labour, Environment and Family (AUF) and Party of Bible-abiding Christians (PBC) merged to form Alliance C – Christians for Germany – AUF & PBC. Ole Steffes (formerly PBC) and Karin Heepen (formerly AUF) were elected Federal Chairmen with equal rights.

The party stood for the first time in the state election in Baden-Württemberg in 2016 and achieved 0.7% in the state constituency of Enz. In the state election in Mecklenburg-Western Pomerania in 2016, it received 842 votes, which corresponds to 0.1% of the votes. In the local elections in Lower Saxony in 2016, the party won a mandate in both Wedemark and Bad Essen. At the party congress on October 22, 2016, the members decided to delete the suffix "AUF & PBC".

An attempted candidacy for the 2017 Bundestag election with eight state lists failed due to a lack of support signatures, so that the party could only put up direct candidates in four constituencies. These achieved results between 0.2% and 0.4% of the votes.

In autumn 2018, MEP Arne Gericke joined Alliance C. Gericke was elected for the Family Party in 2014 and initially switched to the Free Voters in mid-2017. Gericke has been an individual member of the ECPM since 2014, which also includes Alliance C.

Ideology
Alliance C, according to its own statements, is based on Christian ethics and principles that have shaped the liberal-democratic constitutional State. The party advocates "Christian-conservative positions in family, social, educational and foreign policy", including in particular the "fight against abortions and positions of gender mainstreaming and an idealization of marriage and family as a godly connection of men and women, the introduction of an education salary for parents, the support of homeschooling, a strengthening of the nations and criticism of international and supranational alliances such as the UN and the EU, and unconditional support for Israel's right to exist".

Election results

Federal Parliament (Bundestag)

European Parliament

References

2015 establishments in Germany
Political parties established in 2015
Christian democratic parties in Germany
Christian Zionism
Conservative parties in Germany
Social conservative parties
Christian fundamentalism
European Christian Political Movement